Akin Pa Rin ang Bukas (International title: Perfect Vengeance / ) is a 2013 Philippine television drama series broadcast by GMA Network. Directed by Laurice Guillen, it stars Lovi Poe. It premiered on September 9, 2013, on the network's Telebabad line up replacing Mundo Mo'y Akin. The series concluded on December 27, 2013, with a total of 79 episodes. It was replaced by Rhodora X in its timeslot.

Cast and characters

Lead cast
 Lovi Poe as Lovelia Villacorta / Lovelia Ignacio Santos Villacorta-Sandoval

Supporting cast
 Rocco Nacino as Jerry Sandoval / Jericho/Gerard Sebastian
 Cesar Montano as Conrad Alperos
 Charee Pineda as Agatha Morales
 Gary Estrada as Roel Villacorta
 Liza Lorena as Beatrice Villacorta
 Gloria Romero as Cristina Alperos
 Solenn Heussaff as Jade Carmelo
 Ruru Madrid as Junior Morales
 Glenda Garcia as Jenny
 Rodjun Cruz as Xyrus
 Tiya Pusit as Selya

Guest cast
 Ina Feleo as Emma Ignacio
 Freddie Webb as Jaime Villacorta
 Kier Legaspi as Brando Morales
 Jaclyn Jose as Gilda
 Kyle Ocampo as Onay
 Dex Quindoza as Jun
 Leandro Baldemor as Franco Clarete
 Lollie Mara as Conchita
 Steven Silva as Tisoy
 Jan Marini as Ailyn Medrano
 Bryan Benedict

Production

Conception and development
In late April 2013, GMA Network announced that they were developing a yet-to-be-titled Lovi Poe-starrer primetime drama project. The network's resident screenwriter, Denoy Navarro-Punio conceptualized and developed the story which tells of "a woman born out of wedlock, and who, amidst adversaries, gets back on her feet to claim the life and love she deserves."

The network's drama department hired seasoned actress and director, Laurice Guillen to helm the series. In an interview, when asked what got her to accepting an assignment she, in the past, had dodged (she appeared on several television series as an actor, but she wouldn't dip her fingers into it as a director), Guillen admitted that "the offer was good, plus more." The network [for one], accommodated certain requests pertaining to shooting schedules given her aversion to taping long hours or till the "wee" hours of the morning. As to the actors she assembled for the series, Guillen said she was glad that most, if not all, of them are competent performers and "they are the best cast possible in terms of talent and professionalism". She's also very happy with the story, with the writers and creative team, and the network support. Apart from that, Guillen also stated her more personal reasons for saying "yes", said that "I told myself, when will I do something like this? [...] I'm not getting any younger, and when I am no longer physically capable of directing one, I don't want to regret that I didn't do it, at least once."

Production began in June 2013. Most of the series' were shot on location in Tagaytay. Other locations include Antipolo, Quiapo, Manila, and San Juan. The official cast photos, logo and teasers were released in July 2013, while its first-look trailer was released on September 5. The premiere was planned for July 29, but because of some unexpected production-related problems, delayed until September 9, 2013. The show is originally slated to run for sixteen weeks. However, in an interview (Business World, dated November 18, 2013), Poe revealed that the series has been extended for another five weeks "after gaining a strong following since it debuted in September."

Casting
The network began casting for Akin Pa Rin ang Bukas in May 2013. The first actor to be cast was Lovi Poe as the lead protagonist Lovelia Villacorta, followed by Rocco Nacino as Jerry, the love interest.

After the first sit down meeting with creative director Jun Lana, Cesar Montano immediately agreed to star on the series. Montano also stated that it was his desire to work again with director, Laurice Guillen—who was his director in the 1989 film Ang Bukas ay Akin, which he won his very first acting award—as one of the main reasons why he accepted the project.

The network also announced the inclusion of Solenn Heussaff, Gary Estrada and Charee Pineda as series regulars. The role of Jade Carmelo was originally offered to Alessandra de Rossi but she turned it down, and so it was given to Heussaff. Estrada signed on to portray Roel Villacorta, while Pineda was cast as the main villain Agatha Morales.

After signing an exclusive contract with the network, veteran actress Helen Gamboa was cast as Beatrice Villacorta in the project. However, she had to drop out of the series for "health reasons". Gamboa had already finished twenty-two sequences in different locations, so the production had to re-shoot all her scenes. Liza Lorena who was originally tapped to play another important role in the series, was asked to replace Gamboa. On the other hand, veteran actress, Gloria Romero, took the original role of Liza Lorena as Cristina Alperos, stated that she was hesitant to accept the said role when it was first offered to her. But after a meeting with the production people regarding the concept, story line, her character and "when they told me that the director will be Laurice Guillen, I immediately grabbed  the project."

Music
The song "Huwag Kang Mangako" performed by Lovi Poe was used as the theme song of the show. The song was composed by Cecille Azarcon  and it was first sung by Kuh Ledesma in 1990 as part of her album Lihim released by Blackgold Records. Pearisha Abubakar composed for the show.

Reception

Ratings
According to AGB Nielsen Philippines' Mega Manila household television ratings, the pilot episode of Akin Pa Rin ang Bukas earned a 25.2% rating. While the final episode scored a 25% rating.

Critical response
Journal's resident entertainment columnist, Mario Bautista commented on Rocco Nacino's acting performances, saying that "[Nacino is] fascinating to watch in Akin Pa rin ang Bukas because he obviously understands his role well. As the scheming and double dealing Jerry, he is a young man from squatters who try to make it appear in front of Lovi Poe as Lovelia that he is rich and cultured. When he's at home with the squatters, he really acts like a regular uncouth 'sanggan'. But when he's with Lovi and Cesar Montano, he speaks in English and delivers lines he quotes from the Hollywood movies he watches and imitates. In his reviews, Isah Red of Manila Standard Today, praised Poe as she "continues to amaze the audience with her nearly naturalistic performance as a woman who is struggling between death and love." Red also praised series' director Laurice Guillen, said that "[Guillen] is meticulous in making sure that it does not develop into a nonsensical melodrama in which the plot meanders repetitiously. And I am glad its storyline goes into the direction in which we discover a lot about the characters."

References

External links
 
 

2013 Philippine television series debuts
2013 Philippine television series endings
Filipino-language television shows
GMA Network drama series
Television shows set in the Philippines